Luis Castillo may refer to:

Luis Castillo (American football) (born 1983), Dominican-American NFL defensive end
Luis Castillo (second baseman) (born 1975), Dominican Major League Baseball second baseman
Luis Castillo (pitcher, born 1992) (born 1992), Dominican Major League Baseball pitcher
Luis Castillo (pitcher, born 1995) (born 1995), Dominican Major League Baseball pitcher
José Luis Castillo (born 1973), boxer from Mexico
Luis Castillo (Ecuadorian boxer), boxer from Ecuador
Luis Castillo (musician), keyboard player and backup vocalist for American rock band P.O.D.
Luís Leandro Castillo (born 1991), Argentine footballer

See also 
 Luis del Castillo Estrada (born 1931), Uruguayan cleric